The Melanesia blind snake (Ramphotyphlops depressus) is a species of snake in the Typhlopidae family.

References

Ramphotyphlops
Reptiles described in 1880
Taxa named by Wilhelm Peters